José Alexander Amaya del Cid (born January 4, 1975 in San Salvador, El Salvador) is a retired Salvadoran professional footballer.

Club career
Amaya started his professional career with Águila during the 1997–1998 season. He remained there until 1999. He was signed by former El Salvador manager Milovan Đorić's Chinese club side Beijing Guoan in 2000. He participated in both the Chinese First Division league and the Philip FA Cup 2000. After 2000, he returned to El Salvador winning the Clausura title with Águila. However a combination of poor form and injuries caused him to lose his spot in the Águila squad.

In 2006, del Cid signed with Isidro Metapán and remained there until 2009. He signed with Alianza in 2009.

International career
Amaya made his debut for El Salvador in a March 1997 friendly match against Guatemala and has earned a total of 42 caps, scoring 1 goal. He has represented his country in 9 FIFA World Cup qualification matches and played at several UNCAF Cups. He also was a non-playing squad member at the 1998 CONCACAF Gold Cup.

His final international game was a May 2004 friendly match against Haiti.

International goals
Scores and results list El Salvador's goal tally first.

Post football career
Amaya joined the Canal 21 crew, he will become a football analyse talking about issues and announcing games that are played. He is currently the U16 coach of one of the most prestigious school in El Salvador.

References

External links
 

1975 births
Living people
Sportspeople from San Salvador
Association football midfielders
Salvadoran footballers
El Salvador international footballers
1998 CONCACAF Gold Cup players
2003 UNCAF Nations Cup players
C.D. Águila footballers
Beijing Guoan F.C. players
A.D. Isidro Metapán footballers
Alianza F.C. footballers
Expatriate footballers in China